Peters Lake is a lake in the municipality of South Frontenac, Frontenac County in eastern Ontario, Canada. It is in the Lake Ontario drainage basin.

The settlement of Murvale lies just south of the lake on Frontenac County Road 38. The primary inflow, at the north, and outflow, at the south, is Millhaven Creek, which flows to Lake Ontario.

References

Lakes of Frontenac County